Major General Nawab Sir Umar Hayat Khan Tiwana  (5 October 1874 – 24 March 1944), was soldier of the Indian Empire, one of the largest landholders in the Punjab, and an elected member of the Council of State of India.

Background and early life
He was born in Megha, Punjab. His father was Sir Malik Sahib Khan and his family, from Khushab, were part of the Tiwana family of Shahpur.<ref name=www>MALIK MOHAMMED UMAR HAYAT KHAN (TIWANA), Maj.-Gen. Hon. Sir in Who Was Who 1941–1950, (London, A & C Black,)</ref> Khan was educated at Aitchison Chiefs College, Lahore between 1888–93.

Military service
Khan served in the Somaliland War of 1902–1904, receiving the Jidballi medal and clasp, the British expedition to Tibet of 1903-1904 (for which he was Mentioned in Despatches), the European theatre of the Great War between 1914 and 1915 (during which he was Mentioned in Despatches a further six times), and then in the Third Anglo-Afghan War. He was attached to the 18th King George's Own Lancers and later the 19th King George's Own Lancers.

He acted as an honorary aide-de-camp to George V, Edward VIII, and George VI.

Public life
In 1907, moving beyond his career as a soldier, the management of his family estates in the Punjab, and his role as an hereditary Provincial Darbari, Khan became an Attaché to HM the Amir of Afghanistan. He served as a member of the Governor-General of India's Imperial Council from 1910 to 1944.

In 1910, in the Imperial legislature, Khan called for Europeans to supervise districts as "...disinterested men to safeguard the interests of all".

At the Delhi Durbar of 1911, Khan acted as Assistant Herald to Brigadier General William Peyton, the Delhi Herald Extraordinary.Cox, Noel, A New Zealand Heraldic Authority? in John Campbell-Kease (ed), Tribute to an Armorist: Essays for John Brooke-Little to mark the Golden Jubilee of The Coat of Arms, London, The Heraldry Society, 2000, p. 93 & p. 101: "Two heralds, with ceremonial rather than heraldic responsibilities, were appointed for the Delhi Durbar in 1911... Delhi Herald (Brigadier-General William Eliot Peyton) and Assistant Delhi Herald (Captain the Honourable Malik Mohammed Umar Hayat Khan)."

In December 1913, he was elected as one of the seventeen officers of the All-India Muslim League, at the League's Seventh Session held at Agra. He was instrumental in ensuring ex-servicemen were enfranchised in the Montagu–Chelmsford Reforms of 1919.

He was a member of the Council of the Secretary of State for India from 1924 to 1934, as well as becoming an elected member of the Council of State and a member of the Punjab Legislative Council for two terms.

In a deposition for a case in the High Court in 1924, Khan was described as "Colonel Sir Malik Umar Hayat Khan Tiwana KCIE, CEI, MVO, Zamindar of forty-eight thousand bighas at Shapur, Rawalpindi, Honorary Magistrate 1st Class".

London
From 1929 to 1934, he spent most of his time in London, joining the conservative Carlton Club and becoming President of the British Falconers' Club. He was accompanied to London by Sultan Khan, a talented chess player whose career he promoted whilst in the United Kingdom.

In London he resided in the 10 Prince Albert Road, Regent's Park, and held an open house every weekend. Choudhry Rahmat Ali was a regular guest of his during this time and his Now or Never pamphlet was partly penned at the residence.

O'Dwyer v. Nair libel case
In 1924, Khan appeared as a significant witness in the O'Dwyer v. Nair'' libel case, heard in the High Court in London over five weeks from 30 April 1924.

Sir Michael O'Dwyer, Lieutenant-Governor of the Punjab until 1919, sued Sir Chettur Sankaran Nair in a case concerning matters arising from the Amritsar Massacre and the Punjab Disturbances of 1919, and in particular recruiting abuses in the Punjab between 1917 and 1918. The case turned into one of the longest civil hearings in English legal history up to that time.

Khan, appearing as a witness for O'Dwyer, stated that there had been a recruiting quota, namely one third of all villagers of military age. He described the killing of Tahsildar Sayyad Nadir Hussain in Lakk by villagers who strongly objected to his approach to recruiting, and an attack by one thousand rioters on police seeking to enforce recruitment warrants, resulting in the killing of some of the rioters. Under cross examination, he admitted that there had been a "white book" and a "black book", in which village headmen who met recruitment targets and those who did not were listed.

O'Dwyer won his case, with the sole dissenting member of the jury being the political philosopher Harold Laski.

Personal life
His son Malik Khizar Hayat Tiwana went on to become the last Premier of the Punjab.

Honours
Africa General Service Medal with clasp Jidballi, 1903
Delhi Durbar Medal, 1903
Delhi Durbar Medal, 1911
Member of the Royal Victorian Order, Fourth class (MVO), 1911
Knight Commander of the Order of the Indian Empire (KCIE), 1916 (CIE: 1906 King's Birthday Honours)
Nawab (personal title only), 1929
Knight Grand Cross of the Order of the British Empire (GBE), 1934 King's Birthday Honours (CBE: 1919 King's Birthday Honours)
Honorary Magistrate (first class)
President of the Falconers' Club

Military promotions
Honorary Lieutenant in the Indian Army, 1901
Honorary Captain in the Indian Army, 1911
Honorary Major in the Indian Army, 1917
Honorary Lieutenant-Colonel in the Indian Army, 1920
Honorary Colonel in the Indian Army, 1930
Honorary Major General, Indian Army, 1935
Honorary Colonel of 18th King George's Own Lancers
Honorary Extra Aide-de-camp to George V, 1930
Honorary Extra Aide-de-camp to Edward VIII, 1935
Honorary Extra Aide-de-camp to George VI, 1936 to 1944

References

External links

1874 births
1944 deaths
Indian knights
Knights Commander of the Order of the Indian Empire
Indian Knights Grand Cross of the Order of the British Empire
Members of the Council of India
Officers of arms
Aitchison College alumni
People of the Third Anglo-Afghan War
Punjabi people
Indian Members of the Royal Victorian Order
Members of the Imperial Legislative Council of India
Tiwana family
People from British India
Members of the Council of State (India)